The Geostationary Extended Observations (GeoXO) satellite system is the National Oceanic and Atmospheric Administration (NOAA)'s planned replacement for the existing Geostationary Operational Environmental Satellite (GOES) satellites. These new geostationary satellites will make weather, ocean, and climate observations. NASA is developing the satellites and has awarded multiple "Phase A" studies in 2021 and 2022. The project aims to begin observations in the early 2030s as the GOES-R satellites reach their operational lifetime. The first GeoXO satellite is scheduled to be launched in 2032, with two more following in 2035.

References

External links 

 NOAA's GeoXO page

Proposed satellites
2030s in spaceflight